Trave Peak is the partly ice-covered peak rising to 983.5 m in the southeast foothills of Detroit Plateau on Nordenskjöld Coast in Graham Land, Antarctica.  It has precipitous and partly ice-free west and north slopes, and overlooks Edgeworth Glacier to the north, east and south.

The peak is named after the settlement of Trave in Southern Bulgaria.

Location

Maps
 Antarctic Digital Database (ADD). Scale 1:250000 topographic map of Antarctica. Scientific Committee on Antarctic Research (SCAR). Since 1993, regularly upgraded and updated.

Notes

References
 Trave Peak. SCAR Composite Antarctic Gazetteer.
 Bulgarian Antarctic Gazetteer. Antarctic Place-names Commission. (details in Bulgarian, basic data in English)

External links
 Trave Peak. Copernix satellite image

Mountains of Graham Land
Bulgaria and the Antarctic
Nordenskjöld Coast